Nina Doroh (born 25 July 1956) is a Soviet sprint canoer who competed in the late 1970s, born in Gomel Region. She won a complete set of medals at the ICF Canoe Sprint World Championships with a gold (K-2 500 m: 1979), a silver K-2 500 m: 1978), and a bronze (K-4 500 m: 1977).

References

1956 births
Living people
People from Rechytsa District
Soviet female canoeists
Belarusian female canoeists
ICF Canoe Sprint World Championships medalists in kayak
Belarusian State University alumni
Honoured Masters of Sport of the USSR
Sportspeople from Gomel Region